Louise Bager Due (née Bager Nørgaard) (born 23 April 1982) is a Danish former handball goalkeeper and Olympic champion. She received a gold medal with the Danish national team at the 2004 Summer Olympics in Athens.

With Viborg, Due has won multiple titles: the Champions League in 2006 and 2009, the EHF Cup in 2004, five Danish Championship golds (2002, 2004, 2006, 2008, 2009) and four times the Danish Cup (2003, 2006, 2007, 2008).

References

 

1982 births
Living people
Danish female handball players
Olympic gold medalists for Denmark
Handball players at the 2004 Summer Olympics
Viborg HK players
Olympic medalists in handball
Medalists at the 2004 Summer Olympics